Hamadou Derra (born November 27, 1985, in Ouagadougou) is a Burkinabé professional footballer. He currently plays as a midfielder for Rail Club du Kadiogo.

Career
On 1 August 2006, Derra left Rail Club du Kadiogo and signed a contract for FC Botoşani. On 19 September 2008 his club FC Botoşani resigns his contract and he returned to Rail Club du Kadiogo.

Notes

1985 births
Living people
Burkinabé footballers
FC Botoșani players
Association football midfielders
Expatriate footballers in Romania
Rail Club du Kadiogo players
Burkinabé expatriate sportspeople in Romania
Sportspeople from Ouagadougou
21st-century Burkinabé people